This is a list of people who have served as Lord Lieutenant of Hampshire. Since 1688, all the Lords Lieutenant have also been Custos Rotulorum of Hampshire. From 1889 until 1959, the administrative county was named the County of Southampton.

William Paulet, 1st Marquess of Winchester 1551–?
William Paulet, 3rd Marquess of Winchester bef. 1585 – 24 November 1598 jointly with
Henry Radclyffe, 4th Earl of Sussex 3 July 1585 – 14 December 1593
Charles Blount, 1st Earl of Devonshire 4 August 1595 – 3 April 1606 jointly with
George Carey, 2nd Baron Hunsdon 29 October 1597 – 8 September 1603 and
Henry Wriothesley, 3rd Earl of Southampton 10 April 1604 – 10 November 1624
Edward Conway, 1st Viscount Conway 9 May 1625 – 3 January 1631
Richard Weston, 1st Earl of Portland 8 February 1631 – 13 March 1635
James Stewart, 1st Duke of Richmond 29 May 1635 – 1642 jointly with
Jerome Weston, 2nd Earl of Portland 29 May 1635 – 1642 and
Thomas Wriothesley, 4th Earl of Southampton 3 June 1641 – 1642
Interregnum
Thomas Wriothesley, 4th Earl of Southampton 24 September 1660 – 16 May 1667
Charles Paulet, Lord St John 20 December 1667 – 1675
Edward Noel, 1st Earl of Gainsborough 20 March 1676 – 24 December 1687 jointly with
Wriothesley Noel, Viscount Campden 9 April 1684 – 24 December 1687
James FitzJames, 1st Duke of Berwick 24 December 1687 – 4 April 1689
Charles Paulet, 1st Duke of Bolton 4 April 1689 – 27 February 1699
Charles Paulet, 2nd Duke of Bolton 11 June 1699 – 15 September 1710
Henry Somerset, 2nd Duke of Beaufort 15 September 1710 – 24 May 1714
Charles Paulet, 2nd Duke of Bolton 5 August 1714 – 21 January 1722
Charles Paulet, 3rd Duke of Bolton 8 February 1722 – 3 September 1733
John Wallop, 1st Earl of Portsmouth 3 September 1733 – 19 July 1742
Charles Powlett, 3rd Duke of Bolton 19 July 1742 – 26 August 1754
Harry Powlett, 4th Duke of Bolton 13 November 1754 – 25 October 1758
Charles Powlett, 5th Duke of Bolton 25 October 1758 – 15 June 1763
James Brydges, Marquess of Carnarvon 15 June 1763 – 20 August 1764
Robert Henley, 1st Earl of Northington 20 August 1764 – 6 February 1771
James Brydges, 3rd Duke of Chandos 6 February 1771 – 10 May 1780
George Pitt, 1st Baron Rivers 10 May 1780 – 15 April 1782
Harry Powlett, 6th Duke of Bolton 15 April 1782 – 5 April 1793
In commission: 1793–1798
George Paulet, 12th Marquess of Winchester
Sir William Heathcote, 3rd Baronet
William John Chute
Charles Paulet, Earl of Wiltshire 3 March 1798 – 1 March 1800
Thomas Orde-Powlett, 1st Baron Bolton 1 March 1800 – 30 July 1807
James Harris, 1st Earl of Malmesbury 22 August 1807 – 21 November 1820
Arthur Wellesley, 1st Duke of Wellington 27 December 1820 – 1 September 1852
John Paulet, 14th Marquess of Winchester 27 October 1852 – 4 July 1887
Henry Herbert, 4th Earl of Carnarvon 6 August 1887 – 29 June 1890
Thomas Baring, 1st Earl of Northbrook 7 November 1890 – 15 November 1904
Henry Paulet, 16th Marquess of Winchester 21 December 1904 – 24 January 1918
John Edward Bernard Seely, 1st Baron Mottistone 24 January 1918 – 7 November 1947
Wyndham Portal, 1st Viscount Portal 12 December 1947 – 6 May 1949
Gerald Wellesley, 7th Duke of Wellington 9 September 1949 – 19 September 1960
Alexander Francis St Vincent Baring, 6th Baron Ashburton 19 September 1960 – 1973
William James Harris, 6th Earl of Malmesbury 16 April 1973 – 1982
Lt. Col. Sir James Walter Scott, 2nd Baronet 17 December 1982 – 2 November 1993
Dame Mary Fagan 28 March 1994 – 11 September 2014
Nigel Atkinson 11 September 2014 – Present

Deputy Lieutenants
A deputy lieutenant of Hampshire is commissioned by the Lord Lieutenant of Hampshire. Deputy lieutenants support the work of the lord-lieutenant. There can be several deputy lieutenants at any time, depending on the population of the county. Their appointment does not terminate with the changing of the lord-lieutenant, but they usually retire at age 75.

19th Century
31 March 1847: The Marquess of Winchester
31 March 1847: Lancelot Archer Burton, Esq.
31 March 1847: Horatio Francis Kingsford Holloway, Esq.
31 March 1847: Thomas Robbins, Esq.
13 March 1891: John Carpenter Garnier, Esq.
13 March 1891: His Grace The Duke of Wellington
13 March 1891: The Most Hon. The Marquess of Winchester
13 March 1891: The Rt. Hon. The Earl of Northesk
13 March 1891: The Rt. Hon. The Earl of Malmesbury
13 March 1891: The Rt. Hon. The Viscount Lymington
13 March 1891: The Rt. Hon. The Viscount Baring
13 March 1891: The Rt. Hon. The Lord Ashburton
13 March 1891: The Rt. Hon. Lord Montagu of Beaulieu
13 March 1891: The Rt. Hon. Lord Basing, 
13 March 1891: The Hon. John Jervis Carnegie
13 March 1891: The Hon. Anthony Evelyn Melbourne Ashley, 
13 March 1891: Sir Nelson Rycroft, 
13 March 1891: Lieutenant General Sir Frederick Wellington John Fitzwygram, 
13 March 1891: Sir William David King
13 March 1891: Sir Steuart Macnaghten
13 March 1891: Colonel Edward Bance
13 March 1891: William Wither Bramston Beach, Esq., 
13 March 1891: Lieutenant Colonel George Francis Birch 
13 March 1891: Lieutenant Colonel Philip Aithur Campbell Wyndham
13 March 1891: John Bonham-Carter, Esq.
13 March 1891: Chaloner William Chute, Esq.
13 March 1891: Francis Compton, Esq.
13 March 1891: Frederick Gonnerman Dalgety, Esq.
13 March 1891: William Henry Deverell, Esq.
13 March 1891: Admiral Edward Field, 
13 March 1891: Francis Horatio FitzRoy, Esq.
13 March 1891: Francis Michael Ellis Jervoise, Esq.
13 March 1891: Captain Hugh Montolieu Hammersley
13 March 1891: William Howley Kingsmill, Esq.
13 March 1891: Montagu George Knight, Esq.
13 March 1891: Walter Jervis Long, Esq.
13 March 1891: John Mills, Esq.
13 March 1891: John Morant, Esq.
13 March 1891: William Graham Nicholson, Esq.
13 March 1891: Sir Wyndham Spencer Portal, 
13 March 1891: William Barrow Simonds, Esq.
13 March 1891: William Wickham, Esq.

References

External links
Lord Lieutenant of Hampshire

Politics of Hampshire
Hampshire